Lane Powell PC is an American law firm based in Seattle, Washington, with offices in Anchorage and Portland. The firm was established in 1875, making it one of the Pacific Northwest’s oldest and longest-running law firms. Today it employs nearly 200 lawyers. The firm’s clients include individuals, startups, and large businesses, offering corporate, regulatory, and litigation services.

The firm represents or has represented clients such as Nordstrom, Starbucks, Bank of America, Safeway, Cigna, Aetna, Chevron, and BNSF Railway Co.

History

Portland 
In 1875, William D. Fenton began practicing law as a partner at Portland law firm McCain and Fenton. Upon his death, Fenton’s home library was donated to the University of Oregon, which built Fenton Hall in his name. His home, the William D. Fenton House, was added to the National Register of Historic Places in 1979.

After Fenton’s passing in 1918, McCain and Fenton was renamed to Hampson and Nelson, and moved to the Pacific Building in Portland. From 1918-1979, the firm went through several leadership and name changes with the addition of partners like Herbert Anderson, Oglesby Young and William Lubersky. In 1979, John Bledsoe joined as a naming partner, changing the firms name to Spears, Lubersky, Campbell and Bledsoe. Anderson and Young were also added to the naming partner group, renaming the firm in 1988 to Spears, Lubersky, Bledsoe, Anderson, Young and Hilliard.

Seattle
Lane Powell’s Seattle office began in 1889 when John H. Powell arrived in Seattle and practiced law in the firm Stratton, Lewis & Gilman. In 1900, William A. Peters and Powell entered into a partnership under the name Peters & Powell, located in the Dexter Horton Building. The addition of partners such as W. Bryon Lane and Gordon Moss in 1959 led the firm to be named Evans, McLaren, Lane, Powell & Moss. In 1966, Pendleton Miller joined the firm as naming partner, changing the firm to Lane, Powell, Moss & Miller. During this time, the firm expanded to Anchorage by merging with Ruskin, Barker & Hicks.

In 1990, the Portland firm Spears, Lubersky, Campbell, Bledsoe, Anderson, Young & Hilliard merged with Seattle-based firm Lane, Powell, Moss & Miller, leading to the name Lane Powell Spears Lubersky LLP. The company re-named to Lane Powell PC in 2005.

In 2002, when the firm was called "Lane Powell Spears Lubersky LLP", it was part of a court settlement regarding the collapse of the Portland-based investment firm Capital Consultants LLC, for which the law firm was the primary outside consultant.  The settlements, amounting to $25 million, came from the law firm's insurance coverage.

Philanthropy
In partnership with the University of Washington School of Law, Lane Powell annually supports the school through the Ronald E. Beard Scholarship, Gregoire Fellows program and Lane Powell & D. Wayne Gittinger Endowed Professorship.
   
Other beneficiaries include the American Heart Association, Basic Rights Oregon, Campaign for Equal Justice, Food Lifeline, Fred Hutch Cancer Research Center, Start Making A Reader Today (SMART), and the United Way.

Leadership
In 2019, Barbara Duffy was named president of the company.

Notable alumni
 William T. Beeks
 Hon. Thomas S. Zilly
 James Robart

Awards and honors
2021 – Named to BTI Consulting Group’s ‘BTI Client Service A-Team’
2021 – Named as One of the Nation’s Best Places to Work for LGBTQ Equality
2020 – Six Attorneys Recognized as ‘Client Service All-Stars’ by BTI Consulting
2020 – Recognized as 'Top Performer' by Leadership Council on Legal Diversity 
2020 – Ranked Among Nation’s Top Law Firms by US News – Best Lawyers®
2020 – Recognized in Benchmark Litigation
2020 – Received Alaska Bar Association’s Bryan P. Timbers Pro Bono Award
2020 – Earned Top 10 Ranking in Portland Business Journal’s Corporate Philanthropy Awards
2020 – Recognized on ‘40 & Under Hot List’ by Benchmark Litigation
2020 – The Best Lawyers in America© Recognizes 92 Attorneys
2020 – Recognized as a Top Corporate Philanthropist in Puget Sound Business Journal
2020 – Three Attorneys Named in Lawdragon 500 Leading US Bankruptcy & Restructuring Lawyers
2020 – Three Lane Powell Attorneys Recognized by Super Lawyers in Alaska
2020 – Thirty-Two Attorneys Recognized by Super Lawyers in Washington
2020 – Received Top Rankings in Chambers High Net Worth
2020 – Ten Attorneys Recognized by Super Lawyers in Oregon
2020 – Ranked Among The Top 50 Construction Law Firms for the Second Year
2020 – Ranked Among Top Firms in Chambers® USA
2020 – Earned Top Marks in Corporate Equality Index for Fourth Consecutive Year
2019 – Received Oregon Health Care Association’s Outstanding Business Partner of the Year Award
2019 – Recognized as ‘Top Performer’ by Leadership Council on Legal Diversity
2019 – Received Iranian American Bar Association Pro Bono Award
2019 – Ranked Among Nation’s Top Law Firms by US News – Best Lawyers®
2019 – Received Recognition in Portland Business Journal’s 2019 Corporate Philanthropy Awards
2019 – Listed Among America's Top Trusted Corporate Law Firms by Forbes
2019 – Named to Honor Roll in BTI Litigation Outlook Report
2019 – Attorneys Recognized as ‘Top 250 Women in Litigation’ by Benchmark Litigation 
2019 – The Best Lawyers in America© Recognizes 63 Attorneys
2019 – Fiduciary Litigation and Trusts & Estates Teams Receive Top Rankings in Chambers High Net Worth 2019
2019 – Twenty-one Attorneys Recognized by Super Lawyers in Alaska and Oregon
2019 – Thirty-one Attorneys Named ‘Washington Super Lawyers’ and Nine Named ‘Washington Rising Stars’
2019 – Named Among Top 50 Construction Law Firms by Construction Executive
2019 – Recognized as a Top Corporate Philanthropist in Puget Sound Business Journal
2019 – Ranked Among Top Firms in Chambers® USA
2019 – Received 100 percent score in the Human Rights Campaign Foundation’s Annual Corporate Equality Index
2019 – Named One of the Largest Commercial Real Estate Law Firms in the Puget Sound Region
2019 – Named One of the Largest Law Firms in the Puget Sound region by the Puget Sound Business Journal
2018 – Named One of the Nation's Best Places to Work for LGBTQ Equality by The Human Rights Campaign Foundation
2018 – Named in Puget Sound Business Journal "Top 75 Corporate Philanthropists" list

References

External links 
Official website

Economy of Portland, Oregon
Economy of Tacoma, Washington
Law firms established in 1875
Law firms based in Seattle